The Great Martian War 1913–1917 is a 2013 Canadian/UK made-for-television science fiction docudrama film, produced by Michael Kot, Steve Maher, and Mike Slee, and also directed by Slee. It unfolds in the style of an episode from the History TV Channel.

The film as presented is an alternate history of World War I: the European Allies, and eventually America, fight Martian invaders instead of Germany and the Central Powers. Europe is on tenterhooks in the second decade of the 20th century. Everyone is expecting war between the European powers. Then, the German government issues an urgent plea to the world for military intervention that completely changes the reason for that war. Many references to real events in The Great War are woven into the film's fictional narrative. They include parallels to the conflict's mass battles and defeats, as men are thrown against the Martian war machines on the Western front, the Christmas truce, and the Angel of Mons, and America's isolationism and its late entry into the war. The film also utilizes a surprising twist on the real worldwide "Spanish" flu epidemic that killed more people than the conflict itself. It becomes the key development in ending the alien invasion. 

The film is based on the 1897 science fiction novel The War of the Worlds, by English author H. G. Wells, and includes both new and digitally altered film footage shot during the War to End All Wars to establish the scope of the interplanetary conflict.

Plot
Combining period archive materials with state-of-the-art special effects, The Great Martian War 1913–1917 features "previously recorded" interviews with now aging or dead war veterans while looking back at the entire sweep of the interplanetary conflict. The war begins in the depths of Germany's Bohemian Forest, following a massive explosion and shock wave that is felt by the rest of Europe. Elements of the German army are sent to investigate and are wiped out without a trace. The German Emperor makes an urgent appeal to the world for military assistance in fighting what turns out to be a powerful, non-human invading force thought to be from Mars.

As the conflict unfolds, the film showcases the devastation of Western Europe, where a rag-tag human alliance digs in against monstrous Martian fighting machines, unaware that deep flaws exist in their military leadership's central battle strategy. Across the Atlantic, the film outlines the political battle for the White House as President Woodrow Wilson struggles to maintain American isolationism, all the while sending aid and men to the beleaguered European alliance. From the skies over central London, where biplanes battle a towering alien tripod, to the war's catastrophic final act, the Allies, now standing on the brink of total defeat by the alien invaders, must decide if launching an untested and potentially devastating secret biological weapon is worth risking the lives of millions and causing a global pandemic.

Exploring the war's events are modern historians with opposing views about the conflict's many controversies. They most especially disagree on an incendiary new discovery by one of them centered around the uncrackable "Martian Code", a vast century old cache of alien documents seized following the end of the war. These documents now appear to contain the direst of warnings that the war may only be paused, with its second act now unfolding in a way no one can possibly anticipate.

Main cast

Reception
One film reviewer found the film gripping and "not only fascinating to watch, but very realistic right to the very end". Another reviewer commented that the film may be "best described as an interesting curiosity". According to a reviewer for Postmedia News, the film is "a novelty, but an inventive and surprisingly engaging novelty". Still another reviewer states, "What an audacious, perfectly clever, and perfectly realized project. The utmost skill and craftsmanship have delivered this merging of faux archival-style (scratched, battered) footage (appearing as though from The Great War) with an endless CGI army of ruthless Titan alien machines. To my mind, the result was utterly awesome, and 'awesome' is not a word I throw around lightly. Indeed, the entire film seems authentic, and to have pulled it off so satisfactorily reflects uncommonly well on The Great Martian War’s creative team".

See also

References

External links
  at the History Channel WebSite
 
 "The Great Martian War 1913–1917" – GamePlay App
 "The Great Martian War 1913–1917" –  Trailers (00:15); (01:01)

2013 television films
2013 films
Alien invasions in films
British alternative history films
Canadian alternative history films
English-language Canadian films
Canadian mockumentary films
Films based on The War of the Worlds
World War I alternate histories
World War I television films
Canadian science fiction television films
2013 science fiction films
2010s Canadian films
2010s British films